Lucía is a 1968 Cuban black-and-white drama film directed by Humberto Solás, and written by Solás, Julio García Espinosa and Nelson Rodríguez. It was the winner of the Golden Prize and the Prix FIPRESCI at the 6th Moscow International Film Festival in 1969.

The film is a period piece, told in three stories in different moments of Cuban history (the Cuban war of independence, the 1930s during the regime of Gerardo Machado and the 1960s), all as seen through the eyes of a different woman, each named Lucía.

Lucia was digitally restored by the Cineteca di Bologna with funding from World Cinema Project and Turner Classic Movies and later screened at the Cannes Classics section of the 70th Cannes Film Festival in May 2017. The restoration also screened at the 55th New York Film Festival in the revivals section.

Cast

Part 1: Cuban War of Independence 
 Raquel Revuelta as Lucía
 Eduardo Moure as Rafael

Part 2: the 1930s 
 Eslinda Núñez as Lucía
 Ramón Brito as Aldo

Part 3: the 1960s 
 Adela Legrá as Lucía
 Adolfo Llauradó as Tomas

See also
List of Cuban films

References

External links

Lucia. Struggles with History

1968 films
1968 drama films
Cuban black-and-white films
Films directed by Humberto Solás
Films set in the 1890s
Films set in the 1930s
Films set in the 1960s
1960s Spanish-language films
Anthology films
Cuban drama films